A Long Story is an album by pianist and composer Anat Fort recorded in Brooklyn in 2004 and released on the ECM label in 2007.

Reception

The five star Allmusic review by Stephen Eddins states "Fort sets up a basic cool jazz sound and then strays far enough from the expectations she has created to keep the listener constantly engaged and intrigued... The strong character of each of the players and Fort's slightly offbeat musical material make every piece on this outstanding album a pleasure". PopMatters correspondent Matt Cibula reflected "It’s pretty seldom that people can turn down the volume on this crazy world and really concentrate on things that really matter. Like comfortable shoes, and good spicy Spanish wine, and brilliant jazz albums like this". Writing for All About Jazz, Dan McClenaghan noted "A Long Story is one of a handful of albums that can be listened to again and again while revealing different aspects of itself each time. Highly recommended". Less enthusiastic was the JazzTimes review by Thomas Conrad which observed "Fort is a minimalist. She postulates elemental figures, spare lines that she hopes are suggestive. Such a less-is-more approach requires a special muse, and Fort’s ideas are mostly melodically slight".

Track listing
All compositions by Anat Fort except as indicated
 "Just Now, Var. I" - 4:14   
 "Morning: Good" - 7:22   
 "The Thusky" - 5:59   
 "Chapter Two" (Anat Fort, Perry Robinson) - 3:43   
 "Just Now, Var. II" - 3:59   
 "Not a Dream?" - 5:24   
 "Rehaired" - 5:55   
 "As Two / Something 'Bout Camels" - 5:52   
 "Not the Perfect Storm" - 7:21   
 "Chapter One" - 4:14   
 "Just Now, Var.PAT. III" - 2:14

Personnel
 Anat Fort — piano
 Perry Robinson - clarinet, ocarina
 Ed Schuller — double bass 
 Paul Motian - drums

References

ECM Records albums
Anat Fort albums
2007 albums
Albums produced by Manfred Eicher